There may refer to:
There (film), a 2009 Turkish film (Turkish title: Orada)
There (virtual world)
there, a deictic adverb in English
there, an English pronoun used in phrases such as there is and there are